Bulbostylis fasciculata is a species of plant in the family Cyperaceae first described by Hendrik Uittien. It is found in South America. No subspecies are listed in the Catalogue of Life.

References

fasciculata

Flora of Brazil